is a Japanese voice actress. She was born in Osaka, Japan, and enjoys cooking, piano, singing, and using the computer. She was married to fellow voice actor Tsuyoshi Takishita, with whom she worked together in the Warriors Orochi series, from 2009 until his death by motorcycle accident in 2013.

Notable Voice Acting Roles
Eiken - Miharu Shinonome (CD Drama only); Kika
Da Capo - Student (ep 10), Udon House Salesperson
Deception IV: Another Princess - Ephemera
Magical Shopping Arcade Abenobashi - Attendant A (ep 9)
Rune Factory Frontier (Leona/Ganesha)
Ryū ga Gotoku 5: Yume Kanaeshi Mono (Honoka)
Summon Night: Craft Sword Monogatari 2 (video game) - Dina
Samurai Warriors and Warriors Orochi video games series - Gracia Hosokawa.

References

External links
Aoni Productions profile

Shikano Jun
Kobe University alumni
Living people
People from Osaka Prefecture
Year of birth missing (living people)